Gochnatia hypoleuca, the shrubby bullseye,  is a North American species  of plants in the family Asteraceae. It is native to northern Mexico (from Coahuila east to Tamaulipas and south as far as Oaxaca) and just north of the Río Grande in Texas.

Gochnatia hypoleuca is a shrub, stems and undersides of the leaves covered with thick, white woolly hairs. Flower heads are in tight arrays, each head with numerous whitish flowers with lobed corollas. The plant grows in gravel and caliche soils in desert scrub vegetation.

References

External links
Aggie Horticulture, Tesxas A&M University, Chomonque, Ocote Gochnatia hypoleuca Photo, description, ecological information
NaturaLista, Conabio,  ocotillo (Gochnatia hypoleuca)  photos
Irekani, photo of herbarium specimen at Universidad Nacional Autónoma de México, collected in Nuevo León in 1980

Plants described in 1838
Flora of Mexico
Flora of Texas
Gochnatioideae